Cartilage–hair hypoplasia (CHH) is a rare genetic disorder. Symptoms may include short-limbed dwarfism due to skeletal dysplasia, variable level of immunodeficiency, and predisposition to cancer. It was first reported by Victor McKusick in 1965.

Signs and symptoms
 Short limb dwarfism
 Very fine, light hairs and eyebrows
 Hyperextensible joints of hand and feet
 Abnormalities of spine
 Neutropenia
 Defective antibody and cell mediated immunity

Genetics

CHH is an autosomal recessive inherited disorder. It is a highly pleiotropic disorder. A rarely encountered genetic phenomenon, known as uniparental disomy (a genetic circumstance where a child inherits two copies of a chromosome from one parent, as opposed to one copy from each parent) has also been observed with the disorder.

An association between mutations near or within the ncRNA component of RNase MRP, RMRP, has been identified. The endoribonuclease RNase MRP is a complex of RNA molecule and several proteins and it participates in cleavage of mitochondrial primers responsible for DNA replication and in pre-rRNA processing in the nucleolus. The locus of the gene has been mapped to the short arm of chromosome 9.

Immunodeficiency
Patients with CHH usually suffer from cellular immunodeficiency. In the study of 108 Finnish patients with CHH, there was detected mild to moderate form of lymphopenia, decreased delayed type of hypersensitivity and impaired responses to phytohemagglutinin. This leads to susceptibility to and, in some more severe cases, mortality from infections early in childhood. There has also been detected combined immunodeficiency in some patients.
Patients with CHH often have increased predispositions to malignancies.

Diagnosis

Treatment

A verified treatment for this disease is yet to be discovered.

See also
 List of cutaneous conditions
 List of radiographic findings associated with cutaneous conditions

References

Further reading

External links

IUIS-PID table 3 immunodeficiencies
Genodermatoses
Autosomal recessive disorders
Ribosomopathy
Noninfectious immunodeficiency-related cutaneous conditions
Rare genetic syndromes